Baka (also called Be-bayaga, Be-bayaka, and Bibaya de L’est) is a dialect cluster of Ubangian languages spoken by the Baka Pygmies of Cameroon and Gabon. The people are ethnically close to the Aka, the two together called the Mbenga (Bambenga), but the languages are not related, apart from some vocabulary dealing with the forest economy, which suggests the Aka may have shifted to Bantu,  probably 15000 people have shifted.

Classification
Some 30% of Baka vocabulary is not Ubangian. Much of this concerns a specialised forest economy, such as words for edible plants, medicinal plants, and honey collecting, and has been posited as the remnant of an ancestral Pygmy language which has otherwise vanished. However, apart from some words shared with the Aka, there is no evidence for a wider linguistic affiliation with any of the other Pygmy peoples.

Distribution
Baka is spoken much of the southeastern forest zone of Cameroon, in:

Eastern Region
Kadey department (Ndélélé and Mbang communes)
Haut-Nyong department (Dimako, Doumé, Abong-Mbang, Lomié, and Ngoyla communes)
Boumba-et-Ngoko department (Moloundou, Yokadouma, and Gari-Gombo communes)
Southern Region
Dja-et-Lobo department (Bengbis, Meyomessala, Sangmélima, Djoum, Oveng, and Mintom communes)

The Baka live together with other ethnic groups who are mainly located along the main roads. The Baka speak a language very close to that of the Ngbaka Ma'bo of the Central African Republic, which clearly indicates that the Baka of Cameroon had recently arrived from an area much further to the east. In Cameroon, they are referred to as Eastern Pygmies, as opposed to the Bagyali, Pygmy groups from Océan Department who speak a Bantu language (A80 subgroup). They number 25,000 in Cameroon. They are also found in Gabon (Phillips 1980) and in the Central African Republic.

Varieties
It is unclear if Gundi (Ngundi), Ganzi and Massa (Limassa), are mutually intelligible with Baka proper. Most Massa have shifted to Gundi, which is spoken by 9,000 people.

The Ngombe tribe speaks Gundi. It may have been confused in the literature with the Ngombe population speaking the Bangandu language.

Phonology

Consonants 

/d͡z/ can also be heard as post-alveolar [d͡ʒ], among different dialects.

Vowels

References

External links
 Baka Pygmies Culture and photos, with soundscapes of Baka camps in the rainforest
 Baka Forest People  Information, videos, music and photos of the Baka from Moloundou region of Cameroon.
 Baka: A Highly Endangered Language of Northern Cameroun Baka information and word list
ELAR collection: A documentation of the remnant Baka-Gundi language Limassa deposited by Benedikt Winkhart

Ngbaka languages
African Pygmies
Languages of Cameroon
Languages of Gabon